William Mirehouse (29 October 1844 – 16 June 1925) was an English cricketer. He was a right-handed batsman who played for Gloucestershire. He was born and died in Bristol.

Mierhouse made a single first-class appearance for the team, during the 1872 season, against Sussex. Mirehouse did not bat or bowl in the match.

External links
William Mirehouse at Cricket Archive

1844 births
1925 deaths
English cricketers
Gloucestershire cricketers
Cricketers from Bristol